The Rutan Model 40 Defiant is a four-seat, twin-engine homebuilt aircraft with the engines in a push-pull configuration.  It was designed by aerospace engineer Burt Rutan for the Rutan Aircraft Factory.

Development

The prototype Defiant, N78RA, was first flown on 30 June 1978. It had been intended as a proof-of-concept of a very safe light twin design, requiring little trim change and no pilot action in case of engine failure, and with good single engine performance. The prototype is now owned by the Hiller Aviation Museum.

In 1979 the Rutan Aircraft Factory announced they would proceed with certification of a Defiant-based light twin. Adequate financing was not secured for this project, and the design was modified for homebuilt construction as the Model 74, with the second aircraft (built by Fred Keller) appearing at Oshkosh 1983. Plans were offered in mid-1984. 176 sets of plans were purchased before RAF discontinued selling plans in 1985. Nine examples were known to be flying as of mid-1987. Nineteen are registered with the FAA as of 2005.

Design
The Defiant is built using fiberglass layup over Styrofoam core shapes in the same manner as the Rutan VariEze. The main gear is fixed, and there are no flaps. The Propellers are fixed-pitch non-feathering, which is unusual in a twin-engine design. Cockpit entry is through a side hinged canopy. The winglets provide yaw stability. Unusually, the Defiant has a ventral, port offset, forward mounted rudder, as can be seen in pictures of the plane taxiing.

Specifications (Defiant)

References

 Aerofiles information

Defiant
1970s United States civil utility aircraft
Twin-engined push-pull aircraft
Canard aircraft
Mid-wing aircraft
Aircraft first flown in 1978